Olivér Várhelyi (born 22 March 1972) is a Hungarian lawyer and diplomat, and European Commissioner for Neighbourhood and Enlargement from Hungary in the von der Leyen Commission after the rejection of László Trócsányi by the European Parliament.

Biography

Studies 
Várhelyi obtained a Master of European Legal Studies at Aalborg University, Denmark, in 1994, and a Law degree at the University of Szeged, in 1996. In 2005 he passed the bar exam.

Career 
Várhelyi started his career in the Hungarian public administration in 1996 at the Ministry for Industry and Trade. He then moved to the Foreign Affairs Ministry, where he was tasked with alignment with the EU acquis. From 1998 to 2001 he was chief of cabinet of the head of the legal unit of the ministry. He then moved to Brussels at the Hungarian mission to the EU, as legal counselor and then head of legal service until 2006, after Hungary's EU accession.

For two years Várhelyi then served as head of the EU law department at the Hungarian Ministry of Justice. From 2008 to 2011 he briefly served as head of unit at the European Commission, in charge of industrial property rights at the Directorate General Internal Market and Services.

He then moved back to the Hungarian foreign service, service from 2011 onward as deputy head and then from 2015 head of the Permanent Representation in Brussels, with the rank of ambassador extraordinary and plenipotentiary. In his role as Ambassador to the EU, he was considered highly loyal to Orbán, despite having no formal party affiliation. Despite being deemed highly intelligent and extremely knowledgeable, his style has been described as "incredibly rude", with "an abrasive leadership style that has included screaming, yelling and swearing at staffers", as well as adopting a more combative approach in ambassadors' meetings than other permanent representatives.

In 2019 Várhelyi was appointed by Hungary's PM Viktor Orbán to the post of European Commissioner from Hungary to the von der Leyen Commission, after the European Parliament had rejected his first appointee, László Trócsányi. He was entrusted with the portfolio of European Neighbourhood and Enlargement.
 His appointment was greeted by long-standing Orbán allies, including Serbia's President Aleksandar Vučić and Bosnian Serb leader Milorad Dodik. It was decried by several observers and enlargement experts. In his Parliamentary hearing, Várhelyi did not gather two thirds of votes, thus being subject to an additional round of written questions from MEPs.

In his asset declaration, Várhelyi declared ownership of a 5035 m2 farm in Szentendre, a 160 m2 family house in Szeged with a 586 m2 garden, and a 57 m2 apartment in Budapest. He also declared ownership of a BMW from 1992 and a Lexus RS from 2018.

Varhelyi generated controversy on 15 February 2023 for calling fellow MEPs "idiots" during a hearing on the western Balkans. Due to this incident, other MEP's demanded Varhelyi's resignation.

References

External links

1972 births
Aalborg University alumni
Hungarian diplomats
Hungarian European Commissioners
20th-century Hungarian lawyers
Living people
People from Szeged
University of Szeged alumni
European Commissioners 2019–2024
21st-century Hungarian lawyers